Frederick Harrison Hall (15 August 1892 – 4 January 1947) was an Irish cricketer. A right-handed batsman, he played five times for the Ireland cricket team between 1924 and 1930.

Playing career

Prior to making his debut for Ireland, Hall made his first-class debut, playing for Dublin University against Northamptonshire in June 1924. He made his Ireland debut two months later, playing against the MCC in Dublin. The following year, he played a first-class match against Scotland, scoring 34 in the Irish first innings, his highest score for Ireland.

He played twice more in 1926, a first-class match against Oxford University and a match against the MCC, before spending four years out of the Ireland side, returning for his final match, against the MCC, in July 1930.

Statistics

In all matches for Ireland, he scored 43 runs at an average of 5.38.

References

1892 births
1947 deaths
Irish cricketers
Dublin University cricketers
Cricketers from County Cork